Phelsuma pusilla hallmanni is a diurnal subspecies of gecko, a lizard in the family Gekkonidae. The subspecies is endemic to eastern Madagascar and typically inhabits different trees. This day gecko feeds on insects and nectar.

Etymology
The subspecific name, hallmanni, is in honor of German herpetologist Gerhard Hallmann.

Description
Ph. p. hallmanni belongs to the smallest day geckos. The body colour is dark green. On the back there are red dots present. On the snout, a blue triangle is present, which is bordered from behind by a red bar. On the neck and back of the head bluish speckles are present. The tail is turquoise. The flanks are brown or black. The ventral side is white.

Geographic range
The subspecies Ph. p. hallmanni inhabits the east coast of Madagascar. It is only known from the region around Andasibe.

Habitat
Ph. p. hallmanni lives in a moist and warm climate. It inhabits different trees and can often be found on trees on the edge of forest along the road.

Diet
Ph. p. hallmanni feeds on various insects and other invertebrates. It also likes to lick soft, sweet fruit, pollen and nectar.

Behaviour
Ph. p. hallmanni is quite quarrelsome and does not accept other males. In captivity, where the female cannot escape, the male can also sometimes seriously wound a female. In this case the male and female must be separated.

Reproduction
The pairing season of Ph. p. hallmanni is between October and the first weeks of May.

Care and maintenance in captivity
Ph. p. hallmanni should be housed in pairs and needs a well planted terrarium. The temperature should be about 28 °C (82 °F), locally around 30 °C (86 °F), during the day, and drop to around 20 °C (68 °F) at night. The humidity should be maintained between 75 and 80% during the day. It is also important to include two colder months with a daytime temperature of 24 °C (75 °F) and 16 °C (61 °F) at night. In captivity, it can be fed crickets, wax moth larvae, fruit flies, mealworms and houseflies.

References

Further reading
Henkel F-W, Schmidt W (1995). Amphibien und Reptilien Madagaskars, der Maskarenen, Seychellen und Komoren. Stuttgart: Ulmer. .
McKeown, Sean (1993). The general care and maintenance of day geckos. Lakeside, California: Advanced Vivarium Systems.
Meier H (1989). "Eine neue Form aus der lineata-gruppe der Gattung Phelsuma auf Madagaskar ". Salamandra 25 (3/4): 230-236. (Phelsuma pusilla hallmani, new subspecies). (in German).

pusilla hallmanni